Giannone is a surname. Notable people with the surname include:

Karin Giannone (born 1974), British journalist
Luca Giannone (born 1989), Italian footballer
Pietro Giannone (1676–1748), Italian historian
Salvatore Giannone (born 1936), Italian sprinter

Italian-language surnames